The 1996–97 Iraq FA Cup was the 20th edition of the Iraq FA Cup as a clubs-only competition. The tournament was won by Al-Quwa Al-Jawiya for the third time in their history, beating Al-Shorta 7–6 on penalties in the final after a 1–1 draw. Al-Zawraa's Mahmoud Majeed was the tournament's top scorer with eight goals.

Al-Quwa Al-Jawiya also won the Iraqi Premier League, the Iraqi Elite Cup and the Iraqi Super Cup in the 1996–97 season to become the first Iraqi team to win the domestic quadruple.

Bracket

Matches

Semi-finals

First legs

Second legs 

1–1 on aggregate. Al-Quwa Al-Jawiya won on away goals.

Al-Shorta won 1–0 on aggregate.

Final

References

External links
 Iraqi Football Website

Iraq FA Cup
Cup